The men's Greco-Roman light heavyweight competition at the 1936 Summer Olympics in Berlin took place from 6 August to 9 August at the Deutschlandhalle. Nations were limited to one competitor. This weight class was limited to wrestlers weighing up to 87kg.

This Greco-Roman wrestling competition continued to use the "bad points" elimination system introduced at the 1928 Summer Olympics, with a slight modification. Each round featured all wrestlers pairing off and wrestling one bout (with one wrestler having a bye if there were an odd number). The loser received 3 points if the loss was by fall or unanimous decision and 2 points if the decision was 2-1 (this was the modification from prior years, where all losses were 3 points). The winner received 1 point if the win was by decision and 0 points if the win was by fall. At the end of each round, any wrestler with at least 5 points was eliminated.

Schedule

Results

Round 1

Of the six bouts, five were won by fall giving the winners 0 points. Neo also had 0 points after a first-round bye. Avcioglu was the only wrestler with a win by decision and 1 point. All six losers were defeated by fall or unanimous decision, so each had 3 points.

 Bouts

 Points

Round 2

Four men were eliminated with a second loss; Mrášek had the best result among them as one of his losses was by split decision. Bietags, Foidl, and Silvestri maintained their 0 point scores, with Cadier earning a point but still immune from elimination in the following round. Avcioglu's second win was also by decision, leaving him with 2 points. The remaining four wrestlers advanced with 3 points.

 Bouts

 Points

Round 3

All four bouts were won by fall; the winners stayed on their starting point totals (Bietags at 0, Cadier at 1, Knudsen and Neo at 3) as did Seelenbinder (3 points) with a bye. Two of the losers had started with 0 points. They ended with 3 as well. Avcioglu's first loss was enough to eliminate him, as he had 2 points from wins by decision before. Westerlund had his second loss and was also eliminated.

 Bouts

 Points

Round 4

Again each bout was won by fall. Beitags (0 points) and Cadier (1 point) were the only two wrestlers who could afford to lose without being eliminated; neither did. All three losers were eliminated. Seelenbinder and Neo stayed in contention at 3 points. The official report assigns individual ranking through 6th place, leaving Foidl in 7th by default.

 Bouts

 Points

Round 5

Both matches featured one wrestler who could not be eliminated and one who could; in both cases, the vulnerable wrestler lost. Neo finished with the bronze medal over Seelenbinder as his split-decision loss put him at 5 points to Seelenbinder's 6. Bietags and Cadier moved on to face each other in a de facto final.

 Bouts

 Points

Round 6

Cadier won the round 6 bout that effectively served as a gold medal final, with only two wrestlers left.

 Bouts

 Points

References

Wrestling at the 1936 Summer Olympics